Broadcast Film Critics Association Awards 2009 may refer to:

 14th Critics' Choice Awards, the fourteenth Critics' Choice Awards ceremony that took place in 2009
 15th Critics' Choice Awards, the fifteenth Critics' Choice Awards ceremony that took place in 2010 and which honored the best in film for 2009